This is a list of cities and towns in Sierra Leone.

Largest cities
The following table is the list of cities in Sierra Leone by population.

Other notable cities
 Wangechi
 Kalewa
 Magburaka
 Kabala
 Moyamba
 Kailahun
 Bonthe
 Kambia

Towns and villages
 Alikalia
 Binkolo
 Daru
 Falaba
 Gbinti
 Kamakwie
 Kaima
 Koindu
 Lungi
 Lunsar
 Madina
 Mange
 Mano
 Matru
 Momaligi
 Njala
 Pepel
 Pendembu
 Shenge
 Sulima
 Sumbaria
 Taiama
 Tongo
 Tumbu
 Worodu
 Yana
 Yele
 Yengema
 Yonibana

References

External links
 Map

Sierra Leone, List of cities in
 
Sierra Leone
Cities